Darß/Fischland is an Amt in the district of Vorpommern-Rügen, in Mecklenburg-Vorpommern, Germany. The seat of the Amt is in Born.

The Amt Darß/Fischland consists of the following municipalities:
Ahrenshoop
Born
Dierhagen
Prerow
Wieck am Darß
Wustrow

Ämter in Mecklenburg-Western Pomerania
Fischland-Darß-Zingst